The President's Commission on Organized Crime was a United States governmental body that existed during the Ronald Reagan administration. Its chairman was Judge Irving Kaufman. It issued a final report in 1986 (published in 1987), when it was disestablished. The Commission published seven volumes of hearings, including ones on money laundering, Asian organized crime, cocaine trafficking, heroin trafficking, labor-management racketeering, and gambling. It also published three interim reports on money laundering, labor racketeering, and drug trafficking.

See also
 Wickersham Commission
 United States Senate Special Committee to Investigate Crime in Interstate Commerce
 United States Senate Select Committee on Improper Activities in Labor and Management
 President's Commission on Law Enforcement and Administration of Justice

References

Organized Crime, President's Commission on
Presidency of Ronald Reagan
Organized crime in the United States
1984 establishments in the United States
1986 disestablishments in the United States